The 2018 Halton Borough Council election took place on 3 May 2018 to elect members of Halton Borough Council in England. This election was held on the same day as other local elections.

After the election, the composition of the council was:

Election results

Overall election result

Overall result compared with 2014.

Notes

References

2018 English local elections
2018
2010s in Cheshire